Wombats are a family of Australian marsupials. Wombat or Wombats may also refer to:

Aviation
Wombat Gyrocopters, a British autogyro manufacturer
Wombat Gyrocopters Wombat, a British autogyro design

People 
 Ian Damon (born 1935), Australian/UK broadcaster, nicknamed "Wombat"
 Graham Eadie (born 1953), Australian rugby league footballer, nicknamed "Wombat"
 Jan Howard Finder (1939-2013), American science fiction writer and academic administrator, nicknamed "The Wombat"

Places 
 Wombat, New South Wales, Australia, a small township
 Tolmie, Victoria, Australia, a small town originally called Wombat
 Wombat State Forest, Victoria, Australia
 Wombat Island, Enderby Land, Antarctica

Science and technology 
 6827 Wombat (1990 SN4), a main-belt asteroid
 WOMBAT (diffractometer), a high-intensity neutron powder diffractometer
 Wombat (operating system), a high-performance virtualized port of Linux developed by National ICT Australia
Wombat crossing, a raised pedestrian crossing
 Project Wombat, formerly named Stumpers-L, an e-mail list, members of which are called wombats
 Wombat Financial Software, a low latency market data business acquired by NYSE Euronext and renamed NYSE Technologies

Arts and entertainment 
 Wombat (TV series), an Australian children's television series
 Wombat, an Australian rapper
 The Wombats, an indie rock band from Liverpool, England
 The Wombats (EP), released in 2008

Other uses 
 L6 WOMBAT (Weapon Of Magnesium, Battalion, Anti-Tank), a version of the British 120 mm BAT recoilless rifle
 White Plains Wombats, a rugby league football team based in White Plains, New York
 Women's Mountain Bike and Tea Society (WOMBATS), a cycling group founded by Jacquie Phelan
 WOMBAT Situational Awareness and Stress Tolerance Test, a situation awareness or psychological assessment tool
 Wombat and Combat Wombat, 125cc motorcycles produced by Hodaka in the 1970s
 Wombat, a Humvee replica kit